Jilin Ertaizi Airport  is a military airport that formerly served commercial flights to Jilin City in Jilin Province, China. On October 3, 2005, all of its commercial flights were transferred to the newly opened Changchun Longjia International Airport and Jilin Airport halted operation.

Facilities

References

Airports in Jilin
Defunct airports in China
Chinese Air Force bases
2005 disestablishments in China
Jilin City